Giampaolo Pansa (1 October 1935 – 12 January 2020) was an Italian journalist-commentator and, especially during his late years, a prolific author of books and essays. Most of his writings was rooted in recent or contemporary history, notably with regard to the antifascist resistance of the Mussolini years.

Biography

Provenance and early years 
Giampaolo Pansa was born and raised in Casale Monferrato, an industrial town by the Po river and located in the Province of Alessandria. His father Ernesto, the fifth of six children, grew up in poverty. Since Ernesto Pansa was the last child to leave home and marry, his widowed mother moved to his home. The young Giampaolo developed a close relationship with his grandmother, born Caterina Zaffiro in 1869 in the little village of Caresana, which is located north of the Po river.

The Pansas were casual farm workers, but one generation earlier, they all transferred to industrial work. As Giampaolo grew up there were three obvious career options on the horizon. Work in the local Marl quarries was the least appealing. Another possibility would have been a job at one of the many cement factories in the town.

The third, and as it seemed at the time "cleanest", option would have involved following his father's example and working at the Eternit asbestos plant. He attended school locally at the "Istituto Balbo" (secondary school), where he received a "classical education", opening the way for university admission and a chance to move away.

Graduating from school with top marks, complemented by a "cum laude" commendation for his school final exams, Pansa enrolled at the University of Turin, where he studied for a degree in political sciences. One of his teachers at the university was Alessandro Galante Garrone: it was Garrone who encouraged him to study the history of the Second World War and of the Italian Resistance.

He completed his university studies on 16 July 1959 with a degree in Political Sciences, received in return for a dissertation on "The Resistance in the Province of Alessandria (1943–1945)". The work was supervised by Guido Quazza. An expanded version appeared as a book in 1967, entitled for publication, "Guerra partigiana tra Genova e il Po" ("The Partisan War between Genoa and the Po").

His work on the wartime antifascist resistance also earned him the "Einaudi Prize", worth 500,000 lire and, of perhaps greater significance for his future career, drew him to the attention of the power-brokers at the prestigious Turin-based daily newspaper, La Stampa.

Daily newspaper journalist 
In 1961 Giampaolo Pansa joined La Stampa. Between 1961 and 1991 he worked for a succession of nationally distributed newspapers. In the end he contributed, at different stages, to all Italy's' leading papers.
  1961–1964, La Stampa: He undertook a traineeship at La Stampa, then under the directorship of Giulio De Benedetti, between January 1961 and June 1962. He then stayed on for another two years. Some of his most memorable contributions during this period concerned the Vajont disaster.
  1964–1968, Il Giorno: With the Milan-based paper under the directorship of Italo Pietra, Pansa reported on events in the Lombardy region.
  1969–1972, La Stampa: Pansa then returned to La Stampa shortly after Alberto Ronchey took over as director of the newspaper, providing memorable reports on the Piazza Fontana bombing in Milan.
  1972–1973, Il Messaggero: Leaving his northern home-base, he moved to Il Messaggero in Rome where he served as Editor-in-chief under the directorship of Alessandro Perrone, who during the previous five years had pioneered the application of computer graphics and other technological innovations that made Messaggero a uniquely influential newspaper-technology benchmark for Italy. Under Pansa, in charge of a mass-circulation Rome-based daily at a time of growing terrorism and anarchism on the streets, the paper retained it moderate centre-left editorial position that was only slightly to the left of the country's ruling establishment. In the editorial office, however, he inherited a fractious team that took a lead from the acutely quarrelsome relationship between Director Perrone and his cousin Ferdinando Perrone, another major shareholder and a constant presence in the offices. Pansa's editorship came to an end after Messaggero was sold to Montedison in May 1974.
  1973–1977, Corriere della Sera: At the start of July 1973 Pansa joined Corriere della Sera in Genoa, then under the directorship of Piero Ottone, seen by commentators of the time as representative of a younger "more dynamic" generation of newspaper directors. Employed as a "special correspondent", Pansa used his time at Corriere to burnish his credentials as an investigative journalist, notably through a series of pieces produced in partnership with his friend Gaetano Scardocchia, which contributed to the uncovering of the Lockheed scandals.
  1977–1991, la Repubblica: Pansa joined la Repubblica in November 1977. Launched the previous year as Italy's first mass-circulation tabloid newspaper, Repubblica was still under the energetic yet thoughtful control of its co-founder and long-standing director cum editor-in-chief, the "political heavy-weight" Eugenio Scalfari. Pansa joined as a "special correspondent", and in October 1978 accepted a complementary position as the paper's deputy director. Scalfari and Pansa formed an effective partnership in guiding Repubblica through a difficult period of intensified political instability and street terrorism, from which Italy's first serious tabloid emerged with its reputation enhanced and a growing readership which made it, in 1988, the country's top newspaper, with circulation at 730,000 copies. He left in 1991 to pursue other interests, but in 2000 returned to la Repubblica as a regular contributing editor.

Weekly journalist-commentator 
In parallel with his newspaper work, during the 1980s Pansa also worked on a regular basis for several of weekly news magazines.
  1983–1984, Epoca: He created the "Quaderno italiano" (loosely, "Italian notebook") column on Epoca, which at the time when he joined the magazine was under the directorship of Sandro Mayer.
  1984–1987, L'Espresso: He joined Giovanni Valentini's L'Espresso in 1984 and created the well-received "Chi sale e chi scende" (loosely, "Who's on the up and who's on the down") column.
  1987–1990, Panorama: Pansa moved to the Milan-based news magazine, Panorama in 1987, further raising his profile as an unmissable columnist with the magazine through his "Bestiario" ("Bestiary") column. Then as now, Panorama was produced under the aegis of the Arnoldo Mondadori Editore (publishing conglomerate), having originally been launched by Arnoldo Mondadori himself back in 1939. Since 1985 it had operated under the directorship of Claudio Rinaldi. During his time there, Giampaolo Pansa became a co-director of Panorama. His "Bestiario" column built on his reputation for exposing "national malpractice", without descending into hypocrisy.
  1991–2008, L'Espresso: When he returned to L'Espresso in 1991 he was able to bring his "Bestiario" column with him. At the same time Giovanni Valentini moved over to la Repubblica and Giulio Anselmi took over as the director of L'Espresso. Meanwhile, Giampaolo Pansa was installed as co-director. When Anselmi also moved back to the world of daily newspapers, Daniela Hamaui became the magazine's director, while Pansa remained in place as co-director till 2008, the year of his 73rd birthday. According to Pansa, Espresso Director Hamui reacted to his decision to "retire" by screaming throughout the day on which he told her of his decision, "Why do you go away? Why?", following through, after he had left his desk, with a series of angry telephone calls and e-mails.

Perspective 
Through Pansa's career as a journalist, publications produced by the press conglomerate known today as GEDI Gruppo Editoriale predominated. He worked without any significant break, between 1977 and 2008, for two of the group's most successful titles, la Repubblica and then L'Espresso. During his years on la Repubblica his political perspective generally reflected that of the centre-left parties, which for most of the period meant that he would be supportive of the Socialist Party and others representative of opposition to the government in the Chamber of Deputies. He was never slow to criticise the Communist Party – widely perceived by opponents as being "too close to Moscow" – through his political investigations and commentaries, however. His political perspectives were also on display in a book he published under the title "La Repubblica di Barbapapà. Storia irriverente di un potere invisibile" ("The Republic of Daddy Beard. Irreverent history of an invisible power"). By the time the book appeared, in 2014, Pansa had become critical of "Barbapapà's" approach. In his biography Pansa presents a case for the creator of Repubblica demonstrating political bias and, on occasion, heightened self-regard; but he also pays tribute to the sheer genius and total dedication to work which he sees as among of his old boss's formidable array of qualities.

A skilful political reporter, Pansa is considered a leading light among journalists of the Italian "first" republic. He was an attentive observer of facts and of personalities, always among the first to arrive in the press gallery at party political conferences which he attended assiduously, armed with his notebook and opera glasses.

Career highlights 
After the Piazza Fontana bombing, Pansa created a valuable "counterinformation" dossier which helped to identify untruths supplied by the authorities in connection with the aftermath of the bomb massacre. He nevertheless refused to join in with the more virulent aspects of the campaign that ensued: he refused, for example, to be join the 757 politicians, journalists and "intellectuals" who signed the angry Open letter of June 1971, targeting (the subsequently assassinated) Police Commissioner Calabresi following the (never explained) death of the alleged bomb suspect Giuseppe Pinelli while detained police custody and the associated cover-up. Pansa was also among the first of the habitually left-wing journalists to assert without qualification, in response to the terrorism of the 1970s and 1980s that, as he put it, "the Red Brigades were red" – as in genuinely left-wing killers and not, as many with longer memories had assumed, fascist revivalists trying discredit the political left by allowing the Red Brigades to be blamed for atrocities committed by others. Pansa's early and persistent rejection of this widely shared conspiracy theory served to discredit him in the eyes of many "progressive intellectuals". His dogged and revealing investigations of the Red Brigades led to his being targeted, along with his friend and colleague Walter Tobagi. As matters turned out, however, it was Tobagi who was gunned down on a Milan street rather than Pansa.

Pansa also becqme known as an enthusiastic creator of neologisms and sarcastic "definitions", frequently untranslatable, and generally involving politicians and political parties. He cast Fausto Bertinotti as "il parolaio rosso" (loosely, the "Red Word") while he identified Italy's Christian Democratic Party as the "White Whale", a literary allusion referencing the party's ability to survive a thousand battles. He described the irrepressible loyalists surrounding the politician Clemente Mastella as "truppe mastellate" ("mastellated troops"), in a conscious echo of the term "truppe cammellate" ("camel-mounted troops"). The Communist Party was the "red elephant" while the right-wing politician Arnaldo Forlani was "the were rabbit". Nor should it be thought that Pansa always spared his fellow journalists: in 1980 he published as article in la Repubblica under the headline "Il giornalista dimezzato" (loosely, "journalism trashed"), in which he castigated the conduct, which he found hypocritical, of colleagues who in his words, "surrendered half of their own professionalism to the party".

Retirement? 
Reports of Pansa's retirement from L'Espresso on 30 September 2008 tend to explain the development not by pointing out that the move came the day before his seventy-third birthday, but by quoting his own justification that he found himself opposed to the magazine's editorial line. While it is true that during his final twelve year Giampaolo Pansa found more time to publish novels and historical essays, he still contributed to political magazines and newspapers, principally as listed below:
  2008–2010, Il Riformista, Rome
  2009–2016, Libero, Milan: here he took the opportunity, in 2011, to reintroduce his "Bestiario" column.
  2016–2018, La Verità, Milan
  2018–2019, Panorama, Milan
  2019–2020, The Post Internazionale, Rome (online)

He later attributed his decision to leave La Verità in 2018 to what he saw as the paper's "Northern League" drift, while insisting that he had himself always enjoyed complete freedom from the editor to write what he wished.

Novels and historical essays 
The focus to which Pansa would return most frequently in his books and essays was on the wartime resistance, the topic that he had studied for his university degree.

In "Le notti dei fuochi" ("Nights of fire"), published in 2001, Pansa explored the critical period between 1919 and 1922, covering the birth of the Squadrismo movement, Mussolini's March on Rome and the inauguration of Fascism. He followed through, in 2002, with "I figli dell'Aquila" ("Children of the eagle"), the story of a volunteer soldier in the army of the so-called "Italian Social Republic ("Repubblica Sociale Italiana"). Then came the "Blood of the vanquished" cycle, a short series of books on the violence committed by partisans against fascists during and after the war. Despite appearing more than half a century after the events described, there was an element of uneasy shock discernible beneath even in the positive critical reaction which came primarily from representatives of mainstream intellectual centre-left. Pansa had turned for his sources to authorities such as Giorgio Pisanò as Antonio Serena: there were also many personal stories from those who might be identified, in terms of the series title, as the "vanquished".   Pansa's historiographical approach with the six volume cycle was in aggregate unconventional, described by one source as a mixture of "historical novel", serious "Feuilleton commentary" and political polemic. Its overall style and structure were more recently analysed in some depth by Nicola Gallerano. In 2011 the publication of "Poco o niente.  Eravamo poveri. Torneremo poveri" ("Little or nothing. We were poor.  We will always be poor") marked an abrupt change. The book was a portrait of the poor in northern Italy at the cusp of the nineteenth and twentieth centuries. It was the story of Pansa's grandmother and of his own parents.

Controversy over the "Blood of the vanquished" cycle 
As the first volume in the Blood of the vanquished ("Il sangue dei vinti") cycle became more widely read, Pansa found himself in receipt of mounting criticism. There were complaints that he had tarnished the still iconic narrative of the wartime resistance, and that he had been motivated not by virtuous idealism, but by the lure of personal economic gain. The attacks came from many sides: Giorgio Bocca, a long-standing antagonist among Pansa's fellow journalists, was particularly withering with his references to "[journalist]-skinheads of the left".

There were allegations that Blood of the vanquished represented little more than a device intended to attract further editorial commissions from the Berlusconi media empire, while others asserted that the author had merely recycled and embellished incidents and events that had already been identified and recorded by others. Other detractors said that almost all the sources he had used were revisionist ones representing only the fascist viewpoint. That was one accusation that Pansa always rejected with particular vigour, insisting that he had used sources from across the political spectrum and shed new light on a part of history that deserved to be better known than it was. He had certainly done nothing to detract from the meritoriousness and importance of wartime antifascist resistance. He pointed to the various descriptions included of atrocities committed by certain fascist fighters against resistance partisans before being killed themselves. Not all the critics were persuaded. There are reports of book launches at which Pansa found himself engaged in savage discussions about his Blood of the vanquished cycle, not just with members of the far-left but also by "academics" who charged him with the crime of "revisionism". At one event in Reggio Emilia, attended by angry groups both from the left of the arguments and from the right, fighting broke out.
 The episode came to the attention of President Giorgio Napolitano and Senate President Franco Marini, who condemned "the attack on Gaimpaolo Pansa" and "deplored the violence suffered": "We cannot accept what happened – in this case serious – to an intellectual who produces a work of historical reflection which I believe is worthwhile ... of course some share the opinions and some refute them, but there must be freedom for all works of history and literature".

There were also more thoughtful or nuanced, reactions such as that of Ernesto Galli della Loggia, who reacted positively to Pansa's contributions, but still wondered in print what it said about the Italians that people were generally content to ignore many historical crimes for years on end, only taking an interest and providing opinions when a high-profile intellectual from the political left, such as Giampaolo Pansa, placed some such matters on the public agenda. Even the historian Sergio Luzzatto, whose initial bemusement over Blood of the vanquished had translated into a harsh negativity, later came round to an acceptance that the series contained "nothing made up" and demonstrated a reassuring "respect for history". Italian journalist Massimo Fini reviewd Pansa's work positively, but criticized him for relying too heavily on the History of the Civil War in Italy, a 3-volume history of the Italian Civil War published by fascist essayist Giorgio Pisanò in 1966.

Death 
During his final years Pansa lived with his wife at San Casciano, a small town in the hills beyond Siena. It is at San Casciano that his physical remains were interred following a funerary mass attended by townsfolk and journalist colleagues on 14 January 2020. He had died in Rome on 12 January 2020 after several months of suffering with serious Colitis.

Personal 
Giampaolo Pansa married firstly, in 1960, Lidia "Lillina" Casalone from Mortara. The marriage was followed by the birth, in 1962, of the couple's son, Alessandro. In 1993 Pansa also acquired a nephew called Giacomo through his marriage to "Lillina".

Giampaolo Pansa married secondly Adele Grisendi, a party member originally from Montecchio Emilia (RE). They lived as a "de facto couple" between 1989 and 2020, latterly in Tuscany. Adele Grisendi is a writer and former trades union organiser who for many years worked in a top position with the CGIL. She describes herself as a passionate Juventus supporter. She contributed extensively to the "Blood of the vanquished" cycle. They met, originally, on 23 November 1989, when she cautiously approached him and asked a question – probably about politics – as they found themselves travelling together on the train from Rome to Florence. They moved in together a couple of months later.

Notes

References 

1935 births
2020 deaths
University of Turin alumni
20th-century Italian journalists
21st-century Italian journalists
20th-century Italian male writers
21st-century Italian male writers
Bancarella Prize winners
Grand Officers of the Order of Merit of the Italian Republic
People from Casale Monferrato
People from the Province of Alessandria
People from Rome